Coed Eva is a suburb of Cwmbran in Torfaen County Borough, Wales. It lies in the preserved county of Gwent and within the historic boundaries of Monmouthshire.

Demographics
At the 2001 census the following demographic data was revealed :
Population 2,395 (Torfaen 90,949)
48.9% Male, 51.1% Female
Ages
22.9% aged between 0-15
38.0% aged between 16-44
26.7% aged 45–59/64
12.4% of pensionable age

Suburbs of Cwmbran
Electoral wards of Torfaen